Romee Strijd (born 19 July 1995) is a Dutch model. A former Victoria's Secret Angel, she appeared in the brand's annual fashion show from 2014 to 2018. She has worked for brands including Alexander McQueen, Michael Kors, and Carolina Herrera. She has also appeared in magazines such as Vogue, Elle, and Harper's Bazaar.

Early life 
Strijd was born in Zoetermeer, South Holland. She has one younger sister Ise Strijd. She was approached by a scout when she was 13 in Amsterdam and turned it down as she was too nervous and had other dreams. After two years, at 15, she wanted to give modelling a try and was signed to DNA model agency in 2011. She left school to pursue modelling, but returned at the age of 17 to the Netherlands to finish school because the career was overwhelming and she missed home. After time off from modelling she realized her love for modelling and moved to New York City after graduating.

Career

Modeling

Strijd signed with the DNA Model Management agency at 15 years old and worked for two years in Milan, Paris and New York City for brands like Burberry, Louis Vuitton and Prada before taking a break. She has appeared in editorials for British, German, Spanish, Turkish, Japanese and Dutch Vogue, French, Italian, and Dutch Elle, Spanish and Greek Harper's Bazaar, Dutch Marie Claire, and French Madame Figaro.

She has been on the cover of several versions of Vogue, Unconditional Magazine, Harper's Bazaar, Exit, Elle and Maxim (magazine). She posed 26 weeks pregnant on the cover of the November 2020 issue of Dutch Vogue, after She inspired the magazine to dedicate an issue to motherhood.

She has walked runway shows for Alexander McQueen, Badgley Mischka, Balmain, Burberry, Calvin Klein, Celine, Christopher Kane, DKNY, Jeremy Scott, Donna Karan, EDUN, Giambattista Valli, Hussein Chalayan, Isabel Marant, Jil Sander, Jill Stuart, Kenzo, Loewe, Louis Vuitton, Marchesa, Michael Kors, Nina Ricci, Peter Som, Phillip Lim, Prabal Gurung, Prada, Rag & Bone, Rochas, Roland Mouret, Vera Wang, Off White  and Victoria's Secret.

She has appeared in campaigns for Carolina Herrera, Alexander McQueen, Donna Karan, Stradivarius, Michael Kors, Giuseppe Zanotti, H&M, Juicy Couture, Victoria's Secret, and Marchesa.

In 2014, she was chosen to be one of the newcomers at the Victoria's Secret Fashion Show. In 2015, she became a Victoria's Secret Angel. In March 2017 she announced that she was now represented by IMG Models.

In 2018, She was chosen to wear the Shooting Star Swarovski Look in the Victoria's Secret Fashion Show. In 2018, she became a brand ambassador for popular Australian swimwear brand Seafolly.

YouTube
Strijd started her YouTube channel on 16 July 2017 where she posts vlogs, behind-the-scenes, and beauty content. As of 2023, the channel has reached 1.88 million subscribers and a total of 180 million views.

Personal life 
Since January 2010, Strijd has been in a relationship with Laurens van Leeuwen, son of television presenter Bert van Leeuwen. The couple have since gotten their marriage certificate in the United States and plan on eventually having a formal wedding. The couple announced their engagement on 25 January 2022.

In May 2020, Strijd and van Leeuwen announced they were expecting their first child, a girl. Their daughter was born on 2 December 2020. She also revealed that she struggled with PCOS for years, claiming that her weight and high-intensity workouts due to her modeling career were not good for her body, and after she had started being nicer to herself, finally got her period back after seven years. In May 2022, Strijd and Van Leeuwen announced they were expecting their second child. In June, she announced she is expecting another baby girl. Their second daughter was born on 11 November 2022.

Notes

References

External links 

 
 
 
 

1995 births
Living people
Dutch female models
People from Zoetermeer
IMG Models models
Victoria's Secret Angels